Peter Angermann (born 1945 in Rehau, Bavaria) is a German painter based in Nuremberg.

Education and career

Initially, from 1966 to 1968, Peter Angermann, who was born in 1945 in Rehau, a small town in Upper Franconia in Bavaria, studied at the Academy of Fine Arts, Nuremberg, Then, in autumn 1968, he was drawn to the class run by Joseph Beuys at the Kunstakademie Düsseldorf. Constantly showered with his teacher’s praise, he nevertheless – or perhaps precisely for that reason – became co-founder of the legendary YIUP group, which from 1969 on attracted attention inside the academy, and above all in the Beuys class, through provocative actions that were directed even against Beuys himself. On leaving the academy in 1972, Angermann saw that in artistic terms, he had come away empty-handed; his passion for painting had not exactly been fostered by Beuys. Not until a year later, once he had largely jettisoned Beuys’s ideas, did Angermann make a new start in the field of painting. A meeting with his former classmate Milan Kunc proved exceptionally fruitful in this situation. Together they developed a new visual language that was closely oriented to everyday life, while simultaneously being fired by a witty, anarchic impulse. In 1979 Jan Knap joined the two friends, and group NORMAL was born. They championed the rejection of individualism and, in line with this, created a large number of joint works – paintings that in some cases were done in public. By 1981, however, each of the three members had progressed so far in his own artistic development that it was decided to disband the group.
Standing now on his own two feet, Peter Angermann has retained the socio-critical impulse from his earlier works – coupled with that provocative and at times absurdist humour that marks many of his paintings to this day. In 1976 he surprised the world with the first of his “bear paintings” and what was to be the beginning of a series that has kept on expanding. In fact these are paintings of family life, which, while sharpening our eye for the human condition under the strict use of the bear guise, do not baulk at depicting idylls. Ten years later Angermann pulled another surprise out of the hat – at first through the sheer joy of exploring a genre which at that time was frowned on: en plein air painting. In the meantime, this group of works has found a permanent place in his oeuvre and has led him to discover a virtuosity as colourist that also distinguishes his mature, themed works. The two of them – his themed works and his landscapes – alternate without more ado in Angermann’s work, and it is this liaison that makes Angermann so unique in today’s art scene.
Parallel to this, Peter Angermann has also passed his artistic experience on to a new generation of artists, at first through guest professorships at Reykjavík and Kassel, followed from 1996 to 2002 by a professorship at the Städelschule in Frankfurt am Main, and then from 2002 to 2010 at the Academy of Fine Arts, Nuremberg. In 1995, Angermann made his home one hour’s car drive away from Nuremberg, in Thurndorf, where, far removed from the turmoil of the art business, he continues to dedicate himself enthusiastically to the medium that holds every possibility of artistic development open to him: painting.

Exhibitions 

1980 "11. Biennale des Jeunes", Musee d'Art Moderne, Paris
1980 "The Times Square Show", Colab, NYC
1984 "Von hier aus – Zwei Monate neue deutsche Kunst in Düsseldorf"
1986 "Peter Angermann", Living Art Museum, Reykjavik
1992 "Peter Angermann: Stehender Verkehr ",  Kasseler Kunstverein, Germany
1995 "Peter Angermann",  Kunsthalle Nürnberg
1995 "Salut au Monde", Fries Museum, Leeuwarden
2002 "German Landscapes", SA National Gallery in Cape Town
2004 "La boite en valise" – Academy of Fine Arts Prague
2005 "Group Normal", Prague Biennale 2, Carlin Hall, Prague
2005 "Normal Group",  MACI Museo Arte Contemporanea Isernia, Italy 	
2007 "Normal Group", Trevi Flash Art Museum, Palazzo Lucarni, Italy
2008 "To be a teacher is my greatest work of art" – Kunstmuseum Ahlen, Germany
2009 "Joseph Beuys and His Students ",  Sakip Sabanci Müzesi, Istanbul
2009 "Peter Angermann – Autonomoney", Museen der Stadt Bamberg, Germany
2010 "Peter Angermann", Daegu MBC, Gallery M, Korea
2013 "Peter Angermann – Licht am Horizont", Museum Haus Lange, Krefeld, Germany
2014 "Peter Angermann – Die Lust am Sehen", Neues Museum Nürnberg, Germany
2014 "Peter Angermann: Zpátky k umění", Galerie města Plzně
2014 "Streetview", GAVU Cheb
2014 "Wild Heart: German Neo-Expressionism Since the 1960s", China Art Museum, Shanghai
2015 "The 80s, Figurative Painting in West Germany", Städel Museum Frankfurt am Main
2018 "Peter Angermann – PleinAir", Nuremberg, Germany
2019 "Plein Air Kirchen", Luftmuseum, Amberg
2021 "YIUP" ,  Overbeck-Gesellschaft – Kunstverein Lübeck

Public collections 

 Staedel Museum, Frankfurt am Main
 Germanisches Nationalmuseum
 Bavarian State Picture Collections
 Hessisches Landesmuseum Darmstadt
 Deutsches Historisches Museum
 MACI Museo Arte Contemporanea Isernia
 National Gallery of Iceland, Safn, Reykjavik
 Neues Museum Nürnberg
 MMK Frankfurt am Main
 Centraal Museum, Utrecht
 Groninger Museum
 Trevi Flash Art Museum di Arte Contemporanea
 Glasgow Museums, Glasgow
 Galleria d'Arte Moderna e Contemporanea, San Marino
 Staatliche Kaliningrader Kunstgalerie
 Abteiberg Museum, Mönchengladbach
 Museum Ostwall, Dortmund
 Kunstmuseen Krefeld
 Muzeum moderního umění Olomouc
 Johnson Museum of Art, Ithaca NY
Luftmuseum, Amberg

See also
 List of German painters

Sources
Julian Spalding (2010) "The Best Art You’ve Never Seen". 
Ursula Peters "Vom Ansehen der Tiere" Germanisches Nationalmuseum 2009. 
Landesmuseum für Kunst und Kulturgeschichte Oldenburg "100 Jahre, 100 Bilder" Merlin Verlag 2009 
Luca Beatrice (2006) "Normal Group" Giancarlo Politi Editore 
Luca Beatrice (2005) "PragueBiennale2".
Peter Angermann (2001) "pleinair". Verlag für Moderne Kunst Nürnberg. 
Karl Schawelka "Peter Angermann: Malerei 1973 bis 1995" Verlag für Moderne Kunst Nürnberg. 
Stephan Schmidt-Wulffen "Tiefe Blicke" DuMont 1985. 
Kasper König (1984) "von hier aus" DuMont 1984.

External links

References

1945 births
Living people
20th-century German painters
20th-century German male artists
German male painters
21st-century German painters
21st-century German male artists
Artists from Nuremberg
Kunstakademie Düsseldorf alumni
Academy of Fine Arts, Nuremberg alumni
People from Rehau
German contemporary artists
Neo-expressionist artists